In firearms,Tapering refers to components that narrow down, similar to that of a conical fashion hence the name taper.

Barrels

In barrels, this centralises mass to the operator. Not only to reduce weight from the muzzle but also to increase accuracy/acquisition and stabilise the balance handling of the weapon. Also the fact that chamber pressures are higher at the rear of the barrel.

Rifling

In rifling, a Tapered bore/Conical bore is where the caliber narrows off to increase velocity of the round.

Cartridges

In cartridges, this usually helps in chambering/unloading the weapon. This differs than shouldering/bottlenecking as this only refers to the case head of the cartridge that holds the projectile, whereas tapering usually refers to the angled sides of the cartridge.

See also
Squeeze bore
Built-up gun
Fluting (firearms)

References

 The Sportsman's Hand Book Containing Rules, Tables of Weights and Measures, Concise Instructions on Selecting, Caring for and Handling Guns and Fishing Tackle ... and Many Other Hints and Instructions Useful to Beginners By Horace Park · 1885. Page 25
 Amateur Gunsmithing By Townsend Whelen · 1924. Page 62
 English Patents of Inventions, Specifications 1866, 2137 - 2186 1867. Page 12
 The American Rifle A Treatise, a Text Book, and a Book of Practical Instruction in the Use of the Rifle By Townsend Whelen · 1918. Page 134
 Gun Research Declassified Visit to Mauser-Werke 2022. Page 52
 The Ultimate in Rifle Accuracy By Glenn Newick · 1990
 Gunsmithing at Home: Lock, Stock & Barrel - Page 79, John E. Traister · 1996 
 Gunsmithing Modern Firearms: A Gun Guy's Guide to Making Good Guns Even Better, Bryce M. Towsley · 2019
 Gunsmithing - Page 176, Roy F. Dunlap · 1963
 The Complete Guide to Gunsmithing Gun Care and Repair, Charles Edward Chapel 1962. Publisher: Skyhorse Publishing; Revised edition (14 May 2015), Paperback: 512 pages, ISBN 1632202697
 A Look at the Rigidity of Benchrest Barrels
 Why are gun barrels tapered?
 How to taper a rifle barrel
 Calculating Barrel Pressure and Projectile Velocity in Gun Systems | Close Focus Research - Ballistic Testing Services
 Precision Rifle barrel talk, chamber, neck, throat, etc

Firearm components